Lawrenceville is an unincorporated community in northeastern Hancock County, West Virginia, United States. It is directly adjacent to the city of Chester, and has been closely connected to it throughout its history. It is part of the Weirton–Steubenville metropolitan area.

History
The history of Lawrenceville goes back to 1714, when a trading post was established in the area. The town was created by an act of the Virginia legislature in 1814. It once had its own elementary school, but students today commute to Chester.

Geography
Lawrenceville is located on the East Liverpool South U.S. Geological Survey Map, and lies at an elevation of 978 feet (289 m). The GNIS ID codes for Lawrenceville is 1554924.

Notable landmark
 Little Blue Run Lake

References
http://lewis-clark.org/content/content-article.asp?ArticleID=2966

Unincorporated communities in Hancock County, West Virginia
Unincorporated communities in West Virginia